The John Balch House (but for many years was purported to have been built in 1636), located at 448 Cabot Street, Beverly, Massachusetts, is one of the oldest wood-frame houses in the United States.  It is now operated as one of the historic house museums of Historic Beverly, and open seasonally.

History

John Balch gained title to the land on November 11, 1635, through the "Thousand Acre Grant" and apparently was living on this property by 1636.  This was the date assigned to the house by the Beverly Historic Society.  Architectural historians, including Abbott Lowell Cummings, the leading expert on early New England architecture, were only sure that the Balch House was a seventeenth-century house. In 2006, dendrochronological analysis dated the earliest portion (the right-hand side) to 1679. The southern portion of the house was built in 1721.

The house remained within the Balch family until 1916, though with periods of tenant rental. It was then acquired by the Balch Family Association. They hired Norman Isham, a popular preservation architect, to evaluate the house. After finding original rafters in the attic, he recommended that the back lean-to be ripped off and the southern half of the house be dismantled. This plan was eventually modified to expose and recreate the roofline of the original story and a half structure. Thus today's house has been heavily shaped by intentional restoration. In 1932, the home was turned over to the Beverly Historical Society (now Historic Beverly), which maintains and operates it today.

See also

National Register of Historic Places listings in Essex County, Massachusetts
List of the oldest buildings in Massachusetts

References

External links 

Historic Beverly
The Balch House
Salem News, April 25, 2007 (dendochronoly supports 1679 dating)

Houses completed in 1679
Historic house museums in Massachusetts
Museums in Essex County, Massachusetts
Houses in Beverly, Massachusetts
Houses on the National Register of Historic Places in Essex County, Massachusetts
1679 establishments in Massachusetts